Sirajuddin may refer to:

Munabbih ibn Kamil ibn Sirajud-Din Dhee Kibaar Abu-Abdullah al-Yamani al-San'ani, Persian companion of Muhammad
Usman Serajuddin (1258–1357), court scholar of the Bengal Sultanate
Abu Zafar Sirajuddin Muhammad Bahadur Shah Zafar, Bahadur Shah II (1775–1862), last of the Mughal emperors in India
Fouad Serageddin (1910–1999), leader of Egypt's Wafd Party
Abib Sarajuddin (born c. 1942) Afghan held in Guantanamo Bay detention camps, Serial Number 458
Tuanku Syed Sirajuddin of Perlis (born 1943), Raja of Perlis, Yang di-Pertuan Agong of Malaysia
Sirajuddin Haqqani (born c. 1970), Pashtun warlord and military leader
Sirajeddine Chihi (born 1970), Tunisian footballer
Sirajuddin Hamid Yousuf, Sudanese diplomat, Sudanese Ambassador to the Russian Federation
Sirajuddin Muhammad "Din" Syamsuddin, Indonesian politician and formerly the Chairman of Muhammadiyah for two terms from 2005 to 2010 and 2010 to 2015.

Arabic masculine given names